The Arões Sport Club is the football team of São Romão de Arões, Portugal.

Stadium 
The official stadium of Arões is the Parque Municipal Desportos Fafe and has a capacity for 20000 people.

Página do Arões na FPF

Football clubs in Portugal